Bucculatrix serratella is a moth in the family Bucculatricidae. It was described by KShigeki Kobayashi, Toshiya Hirowatari and Hiroshi Kuroko in 2010. It is found in Japan (Honshu).

References

Natural History Museum Lepidoptera generic names catalog

Bucculatricidae
Moths described in 2010
Moths of Japan